Grindmother is a 70 year old Canadian grandmother turned grindcore singer.

Her band's videos have been seen millions of times across the world and she has appeared on several TV and news programs. Footage from a recent rehearsal were viewed over one million times on Facebook.  The name Grindmother is a melding of the grindcore subgenre and her grandmother personae.

In April 2016, Grindmother released her debut album, Age of Destruction, which featured guitar by her son, Rain Forest, and drums by Tyson Apex.  A live guitarist has been added to the band, with Forest handling live bass duties.

She has been reported on extensively by both underground metal and mainstream media. Vice Japan caller her "a super idol of Vice".

On July 26, Grindmother released a cover of Sepultura's "Slave New World" via Decibel.   A post made by Sepultura on their Facebook page read "Last night in Brazil we celebrated Grandparent's Day, and look what we discovered: this version of Slave New World sung by a 67-Year-old grandmother! She's got a project of heavy music called The Grindmother. Their story is so inspiring that was published in the Decibel Magazine."

Grindmother has played live with her band 28 times so far, with dates in Germany, Japan, Canada and the US.

References

Canadian heavy metal singers
Canadian women singers
Canadian punk rock singers
Grindcore musicians
Living people
Year of birth missing (living people)
Canadian women heavy metal singers
Women punk rock singers